Zlatić is a South Slavic surname.

Notable people with the surname include:

 Andrija Zlatić (born 1978), Serbian sport shooter
 Ivan Zlatić (born 1975), Serbian journalist, politician and activist
 Marta Zlatić (born 1977), Croatian neuroscientist
 Savo Zlatić (1912–2007), Croatian physician, politician and chess composer
 Siniša Zlatić, perpetrator of a 2016 mass shooting in Serbia

Croatian surnames
Serbian surnames